Lyakhovo is a rural locality (a village) in Podlubovsky Selsoviet, Karmaskalinsky District, Bashkortostan, Russia. The population was 94 as of 2010. There are 3 streets.

Geography 
Lyakhovo is located 45 km west of Karmaskaly (the district's administrative centre) by road. Repyevka is the nearest rural locality.

References 

Rural localities in Karmaskalinsky District